The 2012 Great West Conference baseball tournament took place from May 22 through 26.  All eight of the league's teams met in the double-elimination tournament to be held at Utah Valley University's Brent Brown Ballpark in Orem, Utah.  Utah Valley won their third championship by a score of 10-6, having advanced undefeated in conference regular season and tournament play.  As the Great West is a new conference, the league does not have an automatic bid to the 2012 NCAA Division I baseball tournament.  Utah Valley has won all three Great West Conference baseball tournaments.

Seeding
All eight teams will be seeded based on conference winning percentage only.

Results

All-Tournament Team
The following players were named to the All-Tournament Team.

Most Valuable Player
Billy Burgess was named Tournament Most Valuable Player.  Burgess was an outfielder for Utah Valley.

References

Tournament
Great West Conference baseball tournament